Barvikha is a village in Odintsovsky District of Moscow Oblast, Russia; serving as a health resort of the President of Russia

Barvikha may also refer to:
Barvikha (settlement), Odintsovsky District, Moscow Oblast, a settlement in Odintsovsky District of Moscow Oblast, Russia
Barvikha Castle, alternative name of Meyendorff Castle in Russia